The 1921–22 Magyar Kupa (English: Hungarian Cup) was the 6th season of Hungary's annual knock-out cup football competition.

Final

Replay

See also
 1921–22 Nemzeti Bajnokság I

References

External links
 Official site 
 soccerway.com

1921–22 in Hungarian football
1921–22 domestic association football cups
1921-22